Jugflower may refer to:

 Adenanthos, a plant genus
 In particular, Adenanthos obovatus